Alamethicin is a channel-forming peptide antibiotic, produced by the fungus Trichoderma viride. It belongs to peptaibol peptides which contain the non-proteinogenic amino acid residue Aib (2-aminoisobutyric acid). This residue strongly induces formation of alpha-helical structure. The peptide sequence is:

Ac-Aib-Pro-Aib-Ala-Aib-Ala-Gln-Aib-Val-Aib-Gly-Leu-Aib-Pro-Val-Aib-Aib-Glu-Gln-Phl

(Ac = acetyl, Phl = phenylalaninol, Aib = 2-Aminoisobutyric acid)

In cell membranes, it forms voltage-dependent ion channels by aggregation of four to six molecules.

Biosynthesis 

Alamethicin biosynthesis is hypothesized to be catalyzed by alamethicin synthase, a Nonribosomal peptide synthase (NRPS) first isolated in 1975. Although there are several sequences of the alamethicin peptide accepted, evidence suggests these all follow the general NRPS mechanism  with small variations at select amino acids. Beginning with the acylation of the N terminal of the first aminoisobutiric acid on the ALM synthase enzyme by Acetyl-CoA, this is followed by the sequential condensation of amino acids by each modular unit of the synthetase. Amino acids are initially adenylated by an “adenylylation” (A) domain before being attached by a thioester bond to an Acyl Carrier Protein-like Peptidyl carrier protein. The growing chain is attached to the amino acid bearing PCP by the "condensation" (C) domain, followed by another round of the same reactions by the next module.

Assembly is completed by the addition of phenylalaninol, an unusual amino acid-like substrate. Following addition of phenylalaninol the completed peptide chain is cleaved by the thioesterase domain, cleaving the thioester bond and leaving an alcohol.

References

Further reading 
 
 Explore structures of Alamethicin at the protein data bank
 Alamethicin in Norine
 From "A voltage-gated ion channel model inferred from the crystal structure of alamethicin at 1.5-A resolution." 
 

Polypeptide antibiotics
Antimicrobial peptides